Chiefdom of Shuidong, ruled by the Song clan, was an autonomous Tusi chiefdom established by Song Jingyang during the Song dynasty. After he conquered the Manzhou Prefecture (蠻州, centred on modern Kaiyang County) from the Yi people, Song Jingyang was recognized as the hereditary ruler of the region by the Song court in 975.

Shuidong was one of the most powerful clans in Southwestern China; Bozhou, Sizhou, Shuixi and Shuidong were called "Four Great Native Chiefdom in Guizhou" by Chinese. Shuidong joint the She-An Rebellion in 1623. After the rebellion was put down, Shuidong was annexed and ruled directly by Ming China.

Origin
The Song clan claimed to be the descendants of a Han Chinese named Song Ding in their genealogy book; however the authenticity needed to be verified. Modern scholars stated that Song Jingyang was a Han Chinese, Bouyei or Miao.

History
In 1303, Song Achong of Shuidong surrendered to the Yuan dynasty, Shuidong came under the Chinese tusi system. In 1371, Song Mongoldai of Shuidong surrendered to the Ming dynasty.

During the Ming conquest of Yunnan, Liu Shuzhen was the female regent of Shuidong, while Shuixi (Mu'ege) was ruled by the regent mother She Xiang. In 1382, She Xiang decided to rebelled against Ming China because she was tortured by the Chinese general Ma Ye. Liu Shuzhen persuaded her not to do. Liu came to Nanjing to reported Ma's behavior. An investigation was carried out, Ma was rebuked and recalled in 1384.

In 1413, the province of Guizhou was created. The capital of Shuidong, Guizhou City (present day Guiyang), was chosen the site of the province's capital. Thirty thousand Chinese soldiers were settled in eastern Guizhou Province.

Since 1373, each Shuidong rulers held the title Guizhou Xuanwei tongzhi; while each Shuixi rulers were granted the title Guizhou Xuanweishi, both were highest aboriginal governors of Guizhou Province. However, the rank of Shuidong rulers were lower than Shuixi rulers'. Initially, the official residences of Shuixi and Shuidong rulers were in Guizhou City, Shuixi rulers were not allowed to go back to his chiefdom freely. This rule was abolished by Ming court in 1479, since then, Shuixi rulers spent most of their life in Shuixi. The power of Shuidong rulers soon expanded rapidly, Shuixi prolonged conflict with Shuidong.

A Miao rebellion against Shuidong ruler broke out in 1513. Song Ran of Shuidong was defeated and fled. Though Ming court ordered Shuixi to suppress, An Guirong of Shuixi was unwilling to do so, because the rebellion was tacit backed by Shuixi. Finally, An Guirong put down the rebellion, since then, Chiefdom of Shuidong went into a slow decline.

The Shuidong ruler Song Cheng'en was a son-in-law of Bozhou chief Yang Yinglong. When Yang rebelled against Ming China, Song Cheng'en refused to joint the rebellion. He was captured and imprisoned in Hailongtun until the rebellion was put down.

The Shuidong ruler Song Wanhua joint the She-An Rebellion, he was captured and executed in 1623. His son Song Siyin rebelled against Ming China, but was put down in 1630. In the same year, Shuidong was fully annexed into the central bureaucratic system of the Ming dynasty.

List of Shuidong chieftains
Below are Shuidong chieftains

References

Tusi
History of Guizhou
Guiyang
States and territories established in the 970s
States and territories disestablished in the 1630s